Group A of the 1995 Fed Cup Asia/Oceania Zone Group I was one of two pools in the Asia/Oceania Zone Group I of the 1995 Fed Cup. Four teams competed in a round robin competition, with the top two teams advancing to the knockout stage and the bottom team being relegated down to Group II for 1996.

South Korea vs. Thailand

Kazakhstan vs. New Zealand

South Korea vs. Kazakhstan

Thailand vs. New Zealand

South Korea vs. New Zealand

Thailand vs. Kazakhstan

  placed last in the pool, and thus was relegated to Group II in 1996, where they achieved advancement back into Group I for 1997.

See also
Fed Cup structure

References

External links
 Fed Cup website

1995 Fed Cup Asia/Oceania Zone